

Preliminary round

Format
The five group winners along with the four best second-place teams will be placed into three groups hosted by Guadeloupe, Cuba and Trinidad & Tobago from 11 October - 9 November.

Teams that did not enter
Nine CFU teams did not enter, meaning 4 fewer participants than in the Caribbean Nations Cup 2006-07 edition. (This became 2 fewer participants, when 2 further teams withdrew during the 2006-07 tournament).  Two teams withdrew before the tournament began ( and ), and the 7 other teams listed below participated only in World Cup Qualification)

1. 
2. 
3. 

4. 
5. 
6. 

7. 
8. 
9.

Group A
All Group A matches were hosted by the Nederlands Antilliaanse Voetbal Unie, the governing body for association football in the Netherlands Antilles.

Notes
  were originally the third team, but they dropped out and  took their place.
  switched to Group B the day before the first match, and  took their place.

Group B
All Group B matches were hosted by the Guyana Football Federation, the governing body for association football in Guyana.

Notes
  qualify as one of 4 best runners-up.
  were originally in Group B, but they dropped out and later rejoined the tournament in Group A.  took their place in this group.

Group C
All Group C matches were hosted by the Cayman Islands Football Association.

Notes
  were originally excluded, but eventually were allowed to play.
 Matches originally scheduled for 29 August were pushed back until 30 August due to Hurricane Gustav.

Group D
All Group D matches were hosted by the Saint Kitts and Nevis Football Association.

Notes
  were originally the third team, but  took their place when Dominica was moved to Group B.

Group E
All Group E matches were hosted by Ligue de Football de Martinique, the governing body for association football in Martinique.

Qualifying round

Group F
Played in Guadeloupe from October 11–15.

Group G
Played in Cuba from October 23–27.

Group H
Played in Trinidad and Tobago from November 5–9.

References 

Caribbean Championship qualification
Qualification